The Judge Advocate General's Corps, also known as the "JAG Corps" or "JAG", is the legal arm of the United States Navy. Today, the corps consists of a worldwide organization of more than 730 commissioned officers serving as judge advocates, 30 limited duty officers (law), 500 enlisted members (primarily in the Legalman rating) and nearly 275 civilian personnel, all serving under the direction of the Judge Advocate General of the Navy.

The headquarters of the Judge Advocate General's Corps of the United States Department of the Navy is located at the Washington Navy Yard in Washington, D.C.

History
In 1775, the Continental Congress enacted the Articles of Conduct, governing the ships and men of the Continental Navy. However, soon after the end of the Revolutionary War, all of these ships were sold and the Continental Navy, to include its Continental Marines, the precursor of today's United States Navy and Marine Corps, were disbanded. In July 1797, Congress, after authorizing construction of six frigates, enacted the Rules for Regulation of the Navy as a temporary measure. Then, in 1800, Congress enacted a more sophisticated code adopted directly from the British Naval Code of 1749. There was little or no need for lawyers to interpret these simple codes, nor was there a need for lawyers in the uncomplicated administration of the navy prior to the American Civil War.

During the Civil War, however, Secretary of the Navy Gideon Welles named a young assistant U.S. Attorney in the District of Columbia named Nathaniel Wilson to present the government's case in complicated courts-martial. Without any statutory authority, Secretary Welles gave Wilson the title of "Solicitor of the Navy Department," making him the first house counsel to the United States Navy.

By the Act of March 2, 1865, Congress authorized "the President to appoint, by and with the advice and consent of the Senate, for service during the rebellion and one year thereafter, an officer of the Navy Department to be called the 'Solicitor and Naval Judge Advocate General.'" The United States Congress maintained the billet on a year-to-year basis by amendments to the Naval Appropriations Acts. In 1870, Congress transferred the billet to a newly established Justice Department with the title of naval solicitor.

Colonel William Butler Remey, USMC, was the first uniformed chief legal officer of the navy, in 1878. Colonel Remey was able to convince Congress that the Navy Department needed a permanent uniformed Judge Advocate General and that naval law was so unique it would be better to appoint a line officer of the navy or Marine Corps. The bill to create the billet of Judge Advocate General of the Navy was signed in 1880.

During World War I, the Naval Appropriations Act of 1918 elevated the billets of navy bureau chiefs and judge advocate general to rear admiral. In July 1918, Captain George Ramsey Clark was appointed the first judge advocate general to hold the rank of rear admiral.

During the rapid expansion of the navy during World War II, line officers who had been attorneys in civilian life were often pressed into service, frequently ad hoc, to serve as prosecutors and defense attorneys in court martial proceedings.  Many of these attorneys remained in the navy following the end of the war as general line officers, but serving as de facto judge advocates.  In 1947, the navy created a "law specialist" program to allow line officers restricted duty to perform legal services. By the Act of May 5, 1950, Congress required that the Judge Advocate General be a lawyer. The Act also required each Judge Advocate General of any service be a member of the bar with not less than eight years of legal duties as a commissioned officer. The Act also enacted the first Uniform Code of Military Justice (UCMJ).

By 1967, the navy had 20 years of experience with the law specialist program. There was, however, increasing pressure to create a separate corps of lawyers.  That year, Congress decided to establish the Judge Advocate General's Corps (JAGC) within the Department of the Navy. The legislation was signed into law by President Lyndon B. Johnson on December 8, 1967, and redesignated all navy lawyers as staff officers within the navy, similar to physicians and chaplains.  Prior to this change, all navy lawyers were Line Naval Officers.

Prior to 2005, JAG Corps personnel primarily worked in one of three offices: Navy Legal Service Offices (NLSO), which were created in 1976 and responsible for providing defense and legal assistance to eligible personnel; Trial Service Offices (TSO), which were established in the mid-1990s and responsible for providing courts-martial prosecution, court reporting and administrative trial support; and Staff Judge Advocates (SJA) providing legal advice to U.S. naval base commanding officers. In 2005, the Judge Advocate General of the Navy approved a pilot program which resulted in the merger of the navy's Trial Service Offices and Staff Judge Advocates into new commands known as Region Legal Service Offices (RLSO). On October 1, 2012 the eight Navy Legal Service Offices were disestablished and four Defense Service Offices (DSO) were established. The legal assistance mission that was previously performed by Navy Legal Service Offices was transferred to the Region Legal Service Offices. The Defense Service Offices focus solely on defense services and personal representation advice for servicemembers.

Additionally, the JAG Corps has attorneys and paralegals on aircraft carriers, amphibious assault ships and flag ships, as well as in support of Seabee battalions and special operations commands.

Insignia

The official insignia of the JAG Corps consists of two gold oak leaves, curving to form a semicircle in the center of which is balanced a silver "mill rinde" [sic]. In ancient France, the fer de moline, or millrind, was a symbol of equal justice for all under the law. The two counterbalancing oak leaves are identical and connote the scales upon which justice is weighed. Oak leaves denote a corps, and symbolize strength, particularly the strength of the hulls of the early American Navy, which were oak-timbered. In the milling of grains, the millrind was used to keep the stone grinding wheels an equal distance apart to provide consistency in the milling process. It, thus, symbolizes that the wheels of justice must grind exceedingly fine and exceptionally even. In the 16th century, this symbol was adopted in England as a symbol for lawyers.

The millrind can also be found in both the Staff Corps Officers Specialty Insignia and in the Enlisted Rating Insignia (LN Legalman).

U.S. Navy ranks and insignias for JAG officers

Legalman

See:  (at "Legalman")
Legalmen are trained paralegals who assist Navy and Marine Corps judge advocates and work in navy legal offices.

On January 4, 1972, Secretary of the Navy John H. Chafee approved the recommendation for establishment of the Legalman enlisted rating. A memorandum from the Chairman of the Rating Review Board announced the approval, stating in part, "the scope of the new rating will provide judge advocates with the personnel trained in court reporting, claims matters, investigations, legal administration, and legal research. This scope is in consonance with the new concept in the civilian legal community where many areas of legal services can be provided by competent trained personnel under the supervision of a lawyer." On October 4, 1972, 275 petty officers were selected for conversion to the new Legalman rating.

In 2007, the Legalman education and training pipeline was adapted in order to fully train Legalmen as paralegals. The Naval Justice School's (NJS) curriculum was adapted to include four American Bar Association (ABA) approved paralegal college courses. Legalmen now leave NJS with 10 semester hours of college credit in paralegal studies.

Naval Justice School

Judge Advocate General of the Navy
The Judge Advocate General of the Navy (JAG) and the Deputy Judge Advocate General of the Navy (DJAG) are appointed positions. They are both nominated by the President and must be confirmed via majority vote by the Senate. The JAG and DJAG are appointed to a four-year term of office but they usually serve for three. The JAG and DJAG have historically been officers in the service of the navy. Federal statutes, however, state that a Marine officer  can be appointed to either position as long as he meets the requirements stated in the section. Currently, the JAG is  appointed as a three-star vice admiral or lieutenant general while holding office and the DJAG is currently appointed as a two-star rear admiral or a major general. Other than age and years of military service, there is no other statute of limitations on how many times a JAG or DJAG can be renominated for appointment to that position if the President so chooses.

List of Judge Advocates General of the Navy

Offices

Headquarters

Office of the Judge Advocate General (OJAG), Washington Navy Yard, Washington, D.C.
Headquarters, Naval Legal Service Command (NLSC), Washington Navy Yard, Washington, D.C.

Defense Service Offices (DSO)
North
 DSO North Headquarters, Washington Navy Yard, Washington, D.C.
 DSO North Detachment, Naval Support Activity Naples, Italy
 DSO North Branch Office, Naval Support Activity Bahrain, Bahrain
 DSO North Detachment, Naval Station Rota, Spain
 DSO North Branch Office, U.S. Naval Academy, Maryland
 DSO North Detachment Groton, Naval Submarine Base New London, Connecticut
 DSO North Detachment Great Lakes, Naval Station Great Lakes, Illinois

West
 DSO West Headquarters, Naval Station San Diego, California
 DSO West Bremerton, Naval Station Bremerton, Washington
 DSO West Branch Office, Naval Station Everett, Washington
 DSO West Branch Office, Lemoore, California

Pacific
 DSO Pacific Headquarters Yokosuka, United States Fleet Activities Yokosuka, Japan
 DSO Pacific Sasebo, United States Fleet Activities Sasebo, Japan
 DSO Pacific Guam, Naval Base Guam, Guam
 DSO Pacific Pearl Harbor, Pearl Harbor Naval Shipyard, Hawaii

Southeast
 DSO Southeast Headquarters, Naval Station Norfolk, Virginia
 DSO Southeast Detachment Mayport, Naval Station Mayport, Florida
 DSO Southeast Detachment Pensacola, Naval Air Station Pensacola, Florida
 DSO Southeast Branch Office Jacksonville, Naval Air Station Jacksonville, Florida
 DSO Southeast Branch Office Gulfport, Naval Construction Battalion Center Gulfport, Mississippi
 DSO Southeast Remote Office New Orleans, Naval Air Station Joint Reserve Base New Orleans, Louisiana
 DSO Southeast Remote Office Millington, Naval Support Activity Mid-South, Tennessee
 DSO Southeast Remote Office Kings Bay, Naval Submarine Base Kings Bay, Georgia
 DSO Southeast Remote Office Guantanamo Bay, Naval Base Guantanamo Bay, Cuba

Region Legal Service Offices (RLSO)
Capital Region
 RLSO Naval District Washington, Washington Navy Yard, Washington, D.C.
 RLSO Northeast Detachment Great Lakes, Naval Station Great Lakes, Illinois

Southeast
 RLSO Southeast Jacksonville, Naval Air Station Jacksonville, Florida
 RLSO Southeast Detachment Mayport, Naval Station Mayport, Florida
 RLSO Southeast Detachment Pensacola, Naval Air Station Pensacola, Florida
 RLSO Southeast Detachment Guantanamo Bay, Naval Base Guantanamo Bay, Cuba
 RLSO Southeast Detachment New Orleans, Naval Air Station Joint Reserve Base New Orleans, Louisiana

Mid-Atlantic
 RLSO Mid-Atlantic, Naval Station Norfolk, Virginia
 RLSO Mid-Atlantic Branch Office Oceana, Naval Air Station Oceana, Virginia
 RLSO Mid-Atlantic Branch Office Little Creek, Joint Expeditionary Base-Little Creek / Fort Story, Virginia
 RLSO Mid-Atlantic Detachment Groton, Naval Submarine Base New London, Connecticut

Southwest
 RLSO Southwest, Naval Station San Diego, California
 RLSO Southwest Branch Office Ventura County, Naval Surface Warfare Center Port Hueneme, California
 RLSO Southwest Branch Office Lemoore, Naval Air Station Lemoore, California

Northwest
 RLSO Northwest, Naval Station Bremerton, Washington
 RLSO Northwest, Branch Office Naval Station Everett, Washington
 RLSO Northwest, Branch Office Naval Station Bangor, Washington
 RLSO Northwest, Branch Office Naval Air Station Whidbey Island, Washington

Pacific
 RLSO Pacific Pearl Harbor Naval Shipyard, Hawaii
 RLSO Pacific Detachment Yokosuka United States Fleet Activities Yokosuka, Japan

Europe Africa and Southwest Asia
 RLSO Europe Africa and Southwest Asia Naval Support Activity Naples, Italy
 RLSO Europe Africa and Southwest Asia Detachment Rota, Naval Station Rota, Spain
 RLSO Europe Africa and Southwest Asia Detachment Sigonella, Naval Air Station Sigonella, Italy
 RLSO Europe Africa and Southwest Asia Detachment Bahrain, Naval Support Activity Bahrain, Bahrain

Trial Judiciary Offices
 Northern Circuit, Washington, D.C.
 Central Circuit, Norfolk, Virginia
 Eastern Circuit, Camp Lejeune, North Carolina
 Southern Circuit, Pensacola, Jacksonville, Mayport, Florida
 Western Circuit, San Diego, California; Bremerton, Washington; Camp Pendleton, California
 WESTPAC Circuit, Pearl Harbor, Hawaii; Okinawa, Japan; Yokosuka, Japan

See also
United States Marine Corps Judge Advocate Division
Staff Judge Advocate to the Commandant of the Marine Corps
Navy-Marine Corps Court of Criminal Appeals
United States Army Judge Advocate General's Corps
United States Air Force Judge Advocate General's Corps
:Category:Judge Advocates General of the United States Coast Guard
United States Coast Guard Legal Division
Judge Advocate General's Corps
Judge Advocate General
Military law

Equivalents in other countries
Judge Advocate of the Fleet
Judge Advocate General (United Kingdom)
Judge Advocate General (Canada)

Portrayal in media
JAG (TV series)
A Few Good Men

Notes

External links
U.S. Navy Judge Advocate General's Corps official website

 
United States Navy, Z